Trappist beer is brewed by Trappist monks. Thirteen Trappist monasteries—six in Belgium, two in the Netherlands, and one each in Austria, Italy, England, France, and Spain—currently produce beer, but the Authentic Trappist Product label is assigned by the International Trappist Association (ITA) to just ten breweries which meet their strict criteria. , Achel is no longer recognized as a Trappist brewery because it does not have any living monks.

History
The Catholic Trappist order originated in the Cistercian monastery of La Trappe, France. Various Cistercian congregations existed for many years, and by 1664 the Abbot of La Trappe felt that the Cistercians were becoming too liberal. He introduced strict new rules in the abbey and the Strict Observance was born. Since this time, many of the rules have been relaxed. However, a fundamental tenet that monasteries should be self-supporting is still maintained by these groups.

Monastery brewhouses, from different religious orders, have existed across Europe since the Middle Ages. From the very beginning, beer was brewed in French Cistercian monasteries following the Strict Observance. For example, the monastery of La Trappe in Soligny already had its own brewery in 1685. Breweries were later introduced in monasteries of other countries as the Trappist order spread from France into the rest of Europe. The Trappists, like many other religious orders, originally brewed beer to feed the community, in a perspective of self-sufficiency. Nowadays, Trappist breweries also brew beer to fund their works and charitable causes. Many of the Trappist monasteries and breweries were destroyed during the French Revolution and the World Wars. In the last 300 years, there were at least nine Trappist breweries in France, six in Belgium, two in the Netherlands, one in Germany, one in Austria, one in Bosnia and possibly other countries.

In 1997, eight Trappist abbeyssix from Belgium (Orval, Chimay, Westvleteren, Rochefort, Westmalle and Achel), one from the Netherlands (Koningshoeven) and one from Germany (Mariawald)founded the International Trappist Association (ITA) to prevent non-Trappist commercial companies from abusing the Trappist name. This private association created a logo that is assigned to goods (cheese, beer, wine, etc.) that respect precise production criteria. For the beers, these criteria were the following:
 The beer must be brewed within the walls of a Trappist monastery, either by the monks themselves or under their supervision.
 The brewery must be of secondary importance within the monastery and it should witness to the business practices proper to a monastic way of life.
 The brewery is not intended to be a profit-making venture. The income covers the living expenses of the monks and the maintenance of the buildings and grounds.  Whatever remains is donated to charity for social work and to help persons in need.

The German Trappist abbey of Mariawald has not produced beer since 1953, however it is a founding member of the Trappist Association and uses the same Authentic Trappist Product logo for its other products.

As of January 2021, Belgium has only 5 Trappist beers (ATP) left since Achel lost its ATP designation due to the last monk leaving the Order. However, its Trappist beer (not ATP) production is still ongoing and has been taken over by Westmalle. In 2012, Belgian Post honored the Trappist breweries in the country with a commemorative collection of stamps. As of 25 January 2023, Achel lost its designation as a Trappist beer due to selling the abbey to a private person.

In the twentieth century, the growing popularity of Trappist beers led some brewers with no connection to the order to label their beers "Trappist". After unsuccessful negotiations, monks sued one such brewer in 1962 in Ghent, Belgium.

The Dutch brewery De Koningshoeven produces Trappist beersbranded La Trappethat are able to carry the "Authentic Trappist Product" logo. Their use of the International Trappist Association logo was withdrawn in 1999, but was restored in October 2005 (see Brouwerij de Koningshoeven for details). A second Dutch Trappist beer, branded Zundert and produced by Abdij Maria Toevlucht, made its debut in December 2013, and has also been granted permission to use the International Trappist Association logo.

An expansion of ITA recognized breweries took place for the first time in 2012 when the trappist brewery of the abbey of Engelszell, Trappistenbrauerei Engelszell in Engelhartszell, Austria started brewing beer at the monastery (the former production had stopped in 1929) and in the same year obtained the Authentic Trappist Product logo for their beer.

In December 2013, Maria Toevlucht's abbey (Zundert, the Netherlands) and St. Joseph's Abbey (Spencer, Massachusetts, United States) were both granted the ATP recognition for their Trappist beers, followed in 2015 by Tre Fontane Abbey brewery in Rome.

In June 2018, the monks of Mount Saint Bernard Abbey in Leicestershire became the first in the UK to brew a Trappist ale. Called "Tynt Meadow" (7.4% ABV), after the location of the abbey, it is available to visitors and sold through public outlets.

International Trappist Association recognised breweries

As of January 2022, fourteen Trappist monasteries that are members of the ITA have beers named after them — six in Belgium, two in the Netherlands, and one each in Austria, Italy, England, France, Spain and the United States.

Authentic Trappist Product label 

In addition to being a Trappist brewery, the monastic communities that are members of the ITA can apply for the Authentic Trappist Product (ATP) label. The following criteria are used for ATP label:
All products must be made within the immediate surroundings of the abbey;
Production must be carried out under the supervision of the monks or nuns;
Profits should be intended for the needs of the monastic community, for purposes of solidarity within the Trappist Order, or for development projects and charitable works.

List of Trappist breweries
There are currently thirteen breweries producing Trappist beer. Ten of them (with the exception of Achel, Mont des Cats, whose beer is not brewed at their monastery but at Chimay, and Cardeña from the Abbey of San Pedro de Cardeña, whose beer is currently produced off-site) are allowed to display the Authentic Trappist Product logo on their beer products.
In January 2021, "Achel" of the St. Benedict's Abbey in Hamont-Achel lost the Authentic Trappist Product label, as the brewing process was no longer supervised by monks on site, but the beer remains a Trappist beer, as the Saint Benedict Abbey falls under the Westmalle Abbey and the abbot of Westmalle Abbey visits the Achelse Kluis every week and supervises the brewing and other activities in the Achelse Kluis. In Januari 2023 the abbey was sold to a private person : from that day on, "Achel" lost the recognition as a Trappist beer.    In May 2022, St. Joseph's Abbey ceased beer production.

Abbey beer

The designation "abbey beers" (Bières d'Abbaye or Abdijbier) was originally devised by Belgian breweries for any monastic or monastic-style beer not produced in an actual monastery. After the introduction of an official Trappist beer designation by the International Trappist Association in 1997, it came to mean products similar in style or presentation to monastic beers. In other words, an Abbey beer may be:
 Produced by a non-Trappist monasterye.g. Cistercian, Benedictine; or
 produced by a commercial brewery under an arrangement with an extant monastery; or
 branded with the name of a defunct or fictitious abbey by a commercial brewer; or
 given a vaguely monastic branding, without specifically mentioning monastery, by a commercial brewer.

Types of beer
Trappist beers are mostly top-fermented, including La Trappe Bockbier, and mainly bottle conditioned. Trappist breweries use various systems of nomenclature for the different beers produced which relate to their relative strength.

The best known is the system where different beers are called Enkel/Single, Dubbel/Double, Tripel/Triple and Quadrupel/Quadruple. These terms roughly describe both the amount of malt and the original gravity. They may refer to the number of crosses or other marks chalked on the casks - two for a Dubbel and three for a Tripel.

Colours can be used to indicate the different types, dating back to the days when bottles were unlabelled and had to be identified by the capsule or bottle-top alone. Chimay beer labels are based on the colour system (in increasing order of strength red, white and blue). Westvleteren beers are still unlabelled.

There is also a number system (6, 8 and 10, as used by Rochefort), which gives an indication of strength, but is not necessarily an exact alcohol by volume (ABV). Achel combine a strength and a colour (of the beer itselfblond or brown) designation.

Enkel
Enkel, meaning "single", is a term used by the Trappist breweries to describe the basic recipe of their beers. The name fell out of fashion with no breweries (Trappist or 'Abbey') using the term until recent years. Instead, "Blond(e)" (La Trappe, Westvleteren), "5" (Achel) or "6" (Rochefort) have been used to describe the brewery's lightest beer. Chimay introduced an Enkel (called Dorée or Gold) commercially in bottles in 2015, Westmalle made their Enkel (called Extra) available commercially through some outlets in 2010. The term is often used interchangeably with 'Patersbier' (meaning Father's beer), as Enkels are a weak beer brewed originally to be consumed by the monks themselves.

Dubbel

Dubbel is a Trappist breweries' naming convention. The origin of the dubbel was a beer brewed in the Trappist Abbey of Westmalle in 1856. Westmalle Dubbel was imitated by other breweries, Trappist and commercial, Belgian and worldwide, leading to the emergence of a style. Dubbels are understood to be a fairly strong (6–8% ABV) brown ale, with understated bitterness, fairly heavy body, and a pronounced fruitiness and cereal character.
Examples are: Westmalle Dubbel, Chimay Red/Premiere, Koningshoeven/La Trappe Dubbel, Achel 8 Bruin, Rochefort 6, and Tynt Meadow.

Tripel

Tripel is a naming convention traditionally used by Belgian Trappist breweries to describe the strongest beer in their range. Westmalle Tripel is considered to be the foundation of this beer style, and was developed in the 1930s. Achel 8 Blond, Westmalle Tripel, La Trappe Tripel, and Chimay White/Cinq Cents are all examples of Trappist tripels. The style has proven popular among secular breweries like St. Feuillien, Bosteels and St. Bernardus. Tripels as a style are generally beers with an alcohol content ranging from 8% to 10% ABV.

Quadrupel

Quadrupel is the name Koningshoeven gave to a La Trappe ale they brew which is stronger and darker than their tripel. Rochefort 10, Westvleteren 12 and Zundert 10 are also examples of quadrupels.

Ranges
The official Trappist breweries (ATP) produce the following beers for consumption:

Chimay:
1. Dorée (Belgian strong ale 4.8% ABV) 
2. Brune (Abbey dubbel, 7% ABV), 
3. Triple (Abbey tripel, 8% ABV), 
4. Bleue (Abbey quadrupel, 9% ABV)
5. Chimay vieillie en barriques (Abbey quadrupel, barrel aged, 10.5% ABV)
6. Verte 150 (Blond, 10% ABV)

Orval:
1. Orval (Belgian ale, 6.2% ABV)
2. Orval Vert (Belgian ale, 4.2% ABV) (patersbier) (only available on tap and bottle at the abbey inn)

Rochefort:
1. "6" (Abbey dubbel, 7.5% ABV)
2. "8" (Belgian strong ale, 9.2% ABV)
3. "10" (Abbey quadrupel, 11.3% ABV)
4. "Triple Extra" (Abbey tripel, 8,1% ABV)

Westmalle:
1. Dubbel (Abbey dubbel, 7% ABV)
2. Tripel (Abbey tripel, 9.5% ABV)
3. Extra (Belgian ale, 4.8% ABV) (patersbier)

Westvleteren:
1. Green Cap or Blonde (Belgian ale, 5.8% ABV)
2. Blue Cap or "8" (Belgian strong ale, 8% ABV)
3. Yellow Cap or "12" (Abbey quadrupel, 10.2% ABV)

Engelszell:
1. Nivard (Belgian ale, 5.5% ABV)
2. Benno (Abbey dubbel, 7% ABV)
3. Gregorius (Abbey quadrupel, 9.7% ABV)
4. Weisse (Weizen, 4.9% ABV)

La Trappe:
1. Puur (organic pale ale, 4.7% ABV)
2. Witte Trappist (witbier, 5.5% ABV)
3. Blond (Belgian ale, 6.5% ABV)
4. Dubbel (Abbey dubbel, 7% ABV)
5. Bockbier (bockbier, 7% ABV)
6. Isid'or (Belgian ale, 7.5% ABV)
7. Tripel (Abbey tripel, 8% ABV)
8. Quadrupel (Abbey quadrupel, 10% ABV) 
9. Quadrupel Oak Aged (Abbey quadrupel, barrel aged, 10% ABV)
10. Nillis (non alcoholic, 0% ABV)
 
Zundert:
1. Zundert (Abbey tripel, 8% ABV)
2. Zundert 10 (Abbey quadrupel, 10% ABV).

Mount St Bernard Abbey:
1. Tynt Meadow (Abbey dubbel, 7,4% ABV).

Spencer:
1. Spencer Peach Saison (Farmhouse ale, 4.3% ABV) 
2. Trappist Premium Pilsner (Pilsner, 4.7% ABV)
3. Trappist Vienna Lager (Lager, 5.5% ABV)
4. Trappist Ale (Belgian ale, 6.5% ABV)
5. Spencer Grapefruit IPA (IPA, 6.5% ABV)
6. Trappist IPA (IPA, 7.2% ABV)
7. Trappist Imperial Stout (Stout - imperial, 8.7% ABV)
8. Trappist Holiday Ale (Belgian strong ale, 9% ABV)
9. Trappist Monk's Reserve Ale (Abbey quadrupel, 10.2% ABV)

Tre Fontane:
1. Scala Coeli (Belgian ale, 6.3% ABV)
2. Tre Fontane (Abbey tripel, 8.5% ABV)
3. Sinergia 21 (Stout Dubbel, 7.5% ABV)

The official Trappist breweries (non-ATP) produce the following beers for consumption:

Mont des Cats:
1. Mont des Cats (Belgian Strong Ale, 7.6% ABV)

Cardeña
1. Cardeña (Abbey tripel, 7,0% ABV).

Achel
1. Achel Blond 8
2. Achel Bruin 8
3. Achel Blond Extra 9.5
4. Achel Bruin Extra 9.5 

In addition, some breweries from time to time produce special brews, for example barrel-aged beers.

Glassware
Belgian breweries have a tradition of providing custom beer glasses: with Trappist breweries, these often take the form of "chalice" or "goblet" style glasses. The distinction between goblet and chalice is typically in the glass thickness. Goblets tend to be more delicate and thin, while the chalice is heavy and thick walled. Some chalices are etched on the bottom to nucleate a stream of bubbles for maintaining a nice head.

Beer tourism
The idea of visiting Trappist monasteries to sample their beers has become more popular in recent years, partly due to promotion by enthusiasts such as the 'beer hunter' Michael Jackson. Some brewing monasteries maintain a visitors' centre where their beers can be tasted and bought (sometimes with other monastic products such as bread and cheese). Visits to the monastery itself are usually not available to the general public, although visitors can overnight in some of the monasteries (like Achel) if their purpose is non-touristic. Currently, Koningshoeven (which brews La Trappe) in Netherlands offers regular tours around their bottling plant, old brewery and parts of their site, along with a beer tasting.

See also

 Alcohol in Christianity
 Christian dietary laws
 Beer in Belgium
 Beer in the Netherlands
 Barrel-aged beer

References

External links
 Official site of the International Trappist Association
 Official website of the Trappist Order

 
Beer in Belgium
Beer in the Netherlands